The Tiananmen Square self-immolation incident took place in Tiananmen Square in central Beijing, on the eve of Chinese New Year on 23 January 2001. There is controversy over the incident; Chinese government sources say that five members of Falun Gong, a new religious movement that is banned in mainland China, set themselves on fire in the square. Falun Gong sources disputed the accuracy of these portrayals, and claimed that their teachings explicitly forbid violence or suicide. Some journalists have suggested the self-immolations were staged.

According to Chinese state media, a group of seven people had travelled to Beijing from Henan province, and five set themselves on fire on Tiananmen Square. In the Chinese press, the event was used as proof of the "dangers" of Falun Gong, and was used to legitimise the government's campaign against the group.

The official account of events soon came under scrutiny, however. Two weeks after the self-immolation event, The Washington Post published an investigation into the identity of the two self-immolation victims who were killed, and found that "no one ever saw [them] practice Falun Gong".

Human Rights Watch (HRW) wrote that "the incident was among one of the most difficult stories for reporters in Beijing at the time to report on" because of a lack of independent information available. The self-immolation victims were accessible only to reporters from China's state-run press; international media, and even the victims' family members were barred from contacting them. A wide variety of opinions and interpretations of what may have happened then emerged: the event may have been set up by the government to frame Falun Gong; it may have been an authentic protest; the self-immolators could have been "new or unschooled" Falun Gong practitioners; and other views.

The campaign of state propaganda that followed the event eroded public sympathy for Falun Gong. Time magazine noted that many Chinese had previously felt that Falun Gong posed no real threat, and that the state's crackdown against it had gone too far. After the self-immolation, however, the media campaign against the group gained significant traction. Posters, leaflets and videos were produced detailing the supposed detrimental effects of Falun Gong practice, and regular anti-Falun Gong classes were scheduled in schools. CNN compared the government's propaganda initiative to past political movements such as the Korean War and the Cultural Revolution. Later, as public opinion turned against the group, according to sources, the Chinese authorities began sanctioning the "systematic use of violence" to eliminate Falun Gong. In the year following the incident, Freedom House said that the imprisonment, torture, and deaths of Falun Gong practitioners in custody increased significantly.

Background 

Falun Gong, also known as Falun Dafa, is a form of spiritual qigong practice that involves meditative exercises, and a philosophy drawing on Buddhist and Taoist tradition introduced by Li Hongzhi in Northeast China in the spring of 1992.  By the late 1990s, it had attracted tens of millions of followers. Falun Gong initially enjoyed official recognition and support during the early years of its development. By the mid-1990s, however, Chinese authorities sought to rein in the growth of qigong practices, enacting more stringent requirements on the country's various qigong denominations. In 1996, Falun Gong came under increasing criticism and surveillance from the country's security apparatus.

On 25 April 1999, more than ten thousand practitioners congregated outside Chinese Communist Party (CCP) headquarters in Zhongnanhai to request legal recognition. That evening, then-CCP general secretary Jiang Zemin issued a decision to eradicate Falun Gong. At Jiang's direction, on 7 June 1999 a special leading group was established within the party's Central Committee to manage the persecution. The resulting organisation, called the 6-10 Office, assumed the role of coordinating the anti-Falun Gong media coverage in the state-run press, as well influencing other party and state entities such as the courts and security agencies. On 19 July, the Central Committee of the Communist Party issued a document effectively banning the practice of Falun Gong. The following day, hundreds of practitioners were detained by security forces.

The persecution that followed was characterised by a "massive propaganda campaign" intended to justify the persecution by portraying Falun Gong as superstitious, dangerous, and incompatible with the official ideology. Tens of thousands of Falun Gong practitioners were imprisoned, and by the end of 1999, reports began to emerge of torture in custody. According to Ian Johnson, authorities were given broad mandates to eliminate Falun Gong and pursue the coercive conversion of practitioners, but were not scrutinised for the methods they used. This resulted in the widespread use of torture, sometimes resulting in death.

Tiananmen Square was one of the main venues where Falun Gong practitioners gathered to protest the persecution, usually by raising banners in defence of the group, or stage peaceful meditation sit-ins. Ian Johnson of the Wall Street Journal estimated that by 25 April 2000, more than 30,000 practitioners had been arrested for attempting to demonstrate in Beijing, most of them in or on the way to Tiananmen Square. Seven hundred Falun Gong followers were arrested during a demonstration in the Square on 1 January 2001.

Chinese authorities struggled throughout the early years of the persecution to turn public opinion against Falun Gong.  Instead, the campaign garnered criticisms from across a wide spectrum of Chinese society, with some commentators drawing comparisons to the Cultural Revolution and Nazi Germany's treatment of the Jews. According to Human Rights Watch, "the leadership's frustration with the failure of its efforts to quickly and thoroughly dismantle Falungong was also evident in its media campaign." The state-run press admitted in late 2000 that Falun Gong was continuing to stage protests in defiance of the ban, and proclaimed that "the 'broad masses' had to be made to understand the 'duration, complexity and ferocity of our battle with Falun Gong.'" In January 2001, Chinese authorities launched a new wave of propaganda to discredit Falun Gong in which they urged state-run media organizations to vilify the group.

Incident 

On 23 January 2001, the eve of Chinese New Year, five people in Tiananmen Square poured gasoline over their clothes and set themselves on fire.

A CNN film crew, who were there on a routine check for a possible Falun Gong protest, observed a man sitting down on the pavement northeast of the Monument to the People's Heroes at the centre of the square. He proceeded to pour gasoline over himself and set himself ablaze. Police officers quickly congregated on the scene and extinguished the flames. Shortly afterwards, another four people on the square set themselves alight. One of the four, a man, was detained and driven away in a police van.

CNN reported that at least two men and altogether five people set themselves on fire after pouring gasoline over themselves. They did not see a child among the self-immolators. The CNN crew began filming the events from a distance, but were quickly intercepted by military police, who detained the journalists and confiscated their equipment. The authorities then put out the flames consuming the other four people's clothing. A police van came to collect the badly burnt man, and two ambulances arrived almost 25 minutes later to collect the other four. The square was completely closed, and security was tight the next day, the most important of the traditional Chinese holidays. Police monitored public access to the square for the New Year celebrations, had fire extinguishers ready, and prevented Falun Gong practitioners from opening banners.

Xinhua named seven individuals as having been involved: Wang Jindong (王進東), Liu Chunling (劉春玲), Liu Siying (劉思影), Chen Guo (陳果), Hao Huijun (郝惠君);  Liu Baorong (劉葆榮) and Liu Yunfang (劉雲芳) . Liu Chunling reportedly died on the scene. A few months later, state media announced the death of her daughter Liu Siying, who, according to state-news, had been hospitalised with severe burns following the incident. The other three were reported to have been "severely disfigured". Beijing denied requests from western journalists to interview the survivors, and only China Central Television and the official New China News Agency were permitted to speak to their relatives or their colleagues.

Chinese media reports 

Xinhua released a story about the incident to foreign media two hours after the self-immolation occurred. Xinhua then distributed a fuller press release seven days later on Tuesday, 30 January, in response to other media reports on the incident. On 31 January, a 30-minute special edition of the current affairs programme Forum told the state's version of the events to the Chinese public. China Central Television aired footage, said to be taken by nearby surveillance cameras, of five people in flames.

The Chinese authorities stated that the seven people who had come to Tiananmen Square with the intention of self-immolating were all from the city of Kaifeng in Henan province. The state-run Xinhua News Agency asserted that the self-immolators were "avid practitioners" of Falun Gong who had taken up the practice between 1994 and 1997, and that they fantasised during the preceding week about "how wonderful it would be to enter heaven". Six of them reportedly took the train on 16 January, meeting Chen Guo, the daughter of one of them, upon their arrival in Beijing. The seven agreed to light themselves in different parts of the Square at 2:30 pm on the designated day with gasoline smuggled there in plastic soda bottles; each had been armed with two lighters in case one would fail. According to the government-run China Association For Cultic Studies website, Wang Jindong stated afterwards that the group arrived in Tiananmen Square by two taxis, and were dropped off at the south of the Great Hall of the People, from where they walked to the spot where they would ignite themselves. Wang said he was approached by police as he was splitting open the soda bottles, and ignited himself hurriedly without assuming the lotus position. A press release from the Chinese government says that Liu Yunfang felt that the police were able to stop him burning himself because he had not attained the "required spiritual level."

Articles in the Yangcheng Evening News and the Southern Daily reported that police had evidence that a few foreign reporters had advance knowledge of the incident, and suggested that such reporters could be charged with "instigating and abetting a suicide." State media claimed surveillance video showed six or seven reporters from CNN, the Associated Press and Agence France-Presse arriving just 10 minutes before the self-immolations took place; however, all three agencies denied advance knowledge of the incidentAP and AFP said they had no reporters in the square at the time, while CNN's chief news executive, Eason Jordan, said the CNN crew were there on a routine check for a possible Falun Gong protest.

Falun Gong response 
Discrepancies pointed out by the False Fire documentary 

According to the documentary False Fire, Liu Chunling, the only self-immolator to have died on the scene, appears to collapse from being bludgeoned on the head by a man in military suit.

False Fire, a NTDTV attempt to deconstruct the event points out several inconsistencies in the Chinese Government's version of the story, including:"Second Investigation Report on the 'Tiananmen Square Self-Immolation Incident.'"  , World Organization to Investigate the Persecution of Falun Gong (WOIPFalun Gong), August 2003. Retrieved 6 February 2007
 Liu Chunling, the only self-immolator who died on the spot appears to fall from being bludgeoned on the head by a man in military suit. The programme argues that Liu could have died from a severe blow to the head.
 The self immolators appear to be wearing several layers of, possibly fire-protective, clothing and masks. The hair and bottle of gasoline at the feet of an alleged self-immolator are intact, although this should have caught fire first.
 Police, who normally are not known to carry fire extinguishers on duty, appeared to have used almost 25 pieces of fire-fighting equipment on hand on the day of the self-immolations. The nearest building is 10 minutes away and footage shows that only two police vehicles were at the scene. The flames were put out in less than a minute's time.
 The camera of the CCTV footage zooms in on the scene as it unfolds; surveillance cameras in Tiananmen Square are usually fixed.
 Wang Jindong shouts comments that do not form part of Falun Dafa teachings; his posture, including hand position and sitting position, does not reflect the full or half lotus position required in Falun Dafa exercises.
 The hospital treatment of the victims, as recorded by Chinese state media, is inconsistent with proper care of severe burn victims: for instance, patients were not kept in sterile rooms.
 The girl who allegedly underwent a tracheotomy appeared to be able to speak and sing clearly mere days after the surgery.

Immediately following the self-immolation, the Falun Dafa Information Center denied that the self-immolators could have been Falun Gong practitioners, emphatically pointing out that Falun Gong's teachings do not sanction any form of violence, and that suicide is considered a sin.

Falun Gong sources overseas questioned the official Chinese government account of the event, and apparent inconsistencies in government's official narrative led to a hypothesis that the self-immolation was staged by the government to justify the persecution against Falun Gong by portraying its practitioners as irrational and suicidal. According to this hypothesis, the self-immolation participants were paid actors, and were presumably assured that the flames would be extinguished before doing real harm.

Falun Gong-affiliated New Tang Dynasty Television produced a programme called False Fire, which analyses the inconsistencies in the accounts of the event in the official Chinese media.

Based on a review of CCTV footage, the programme purports to demonstrate that the self-immolators donned fire-proof clothing and masks, and raises the question of why the participants' hair and the apparently gasoline-filled bottles they carried did not catch fire. Falun Gong sources also noted that the self-immolators' behaviour, the slogans they shouted, and their meditation postures were not consistent with the teachings or practices of Falun Gong. Furthermore, the program's frame-by-frame analysis of the CCTV footage purportedly shows that Liu was actually killed by a deadly blow to the head from a man in a military overcoat. The False Fire documentary described the death of 12-year-old Liu Siying as being under "unusual circumstances", saying that she was apparently recovering well before dying suddenly on 17 March. Some Falun Gong sources argue that she may have been killed by the government as a way of guaranteeing her silence.

The program suggests that the reaction time of state-run television crews and police on Tiananmen Square demonstrates they had advance knowledge of the event. They observed that officers arrived almost immediately on the scene equipped with numerous fire extinguishers. Fire extinguishers are not standard equipment for police on Tiananmen Square; the nearest building that would house them was several minutes away from the scene.

The World Organization to Investigate the Persecution of Falun Gong further called attention to portrayals of Wang Jindong on state-run television, claiming that the man who self-immolated on the square was not the same person who appeared in subsequent interviews with CCTV. It pointed to a voice analysis conducted by the Speech Processing Laboratory at National Taiwan University, which concluded that the voices did not match, and also noted that the hairline and facial proportions appeared to be different. These observations were used to advance the theory that the self-immolators were actors.

Third-party findings 

The identities of some of the self-immolators, and their relationship to Falun Gong, was called into question by Philip Pan of the Washington Post. While state-run Xinhua News Agency had reported that Liu Chunling's adoptive mother spoke of Liu's "obsession with Falun Gong", her "worshipping of Li Hongzhi", and that Liu would teach her daughter Falun Gong, Pan found most residents in Kaifeng felt disgraced by what Liu had done (i.e. the self-immolation), but none of Liu's neighbours had ever observed her practising Falun Gong. They said that Liu abused her mother, and the reporter heard that Liu "worked in a nightclub, took money to keep men company". According to David Ownby, a University of Montreal historian and expert on Falun Gong, Pan's portrayal of Liu Chunlin is highly inconsistent with the typical profile of a Falun Gong practitioner.

Several observers have noted that foreign journalists were not allowed to interview the self-immolation victims recovering in hospitals. Even the victims' relatives were not permitted to speak with them, according to David Ownby. Pan wrote that "Beijing denied requests to interview Liu Siying and the three other survivors, who are all hospitalized ... A Kaifeng official said only China Central Television and the official New China News Agency were permitted to speak to their relatives or their colleagues. A man who answered the door at the Liu home referred questions to the government." The survivors were interviewed by the state-run press, however. In one such interview, CCTV interviewed the 12-year-old Liu Siying. Government sources reported Liu Siying had undergone a tracheotomy shortly before the interview. Speaking through approved media outlets, she said that her own mother told her to set herself on fire to reach the "heavenly golden kingdom".

According to Schechter, Xinhua had unusually released a statement on the self-immolation to foreign media only hours after the event occurred, saying that this was unusual because sensitive subjects in the Chinese press are almost never reported on a timely basis. The usual protocol is approval by several party officials before publication, which usually takes a fair amount of time. Ian Johnson similarly observed the state media "reported [the victim's] death with unusual alacrity, implying that either the death took place earlier than reported or the usually cautious media had top-level approval to rush out electronic reports and a televised dispatch."

Questions were also raised over where the footage of the event came from, and the speed with which camera crews appeared on scene. Chinese government media reported that the close-up shots in its video footage came from confiscated CNN tapes. CNN representatives argued that this was impossible, however, as their reporters were detained shortly after the event began and were not allowed to film the rest. Pan was also suspicious of the positioning of the cameras, and the fact that the close-up shots shown on Chinese television were taken without police interference. "In some, the camera is clearly behind police barricades", the Washington Post article says. In addition, overhead surveillance camera footage seemed to show a man filming the scene using a small hand-held camera, rather than a large camera of the type used for TV news reporting.

The Age commented that the "ready availability of fire-extinguishers and official TV teams and the lack of verification about the victims" raised questions about whether authorities had advanced knowledge of the self-immolation. Police were on the scene of the self-immolation within 90 seconds carrying numerous pieces of firefighting equipment. A European journalist was quoted as saying "I have never seen policemen patrolling on Tiananmen Square carrying fire extinguishers. How come they all showed up today? The location of the incident is at least 20 minutes roundtrip from the nearest building – the People's Great Hall." John Gittings of The Guardian stated, however, that it was common practice in many countries for police camera operators to be on hand when a public disturbance is anticipated; the police used small-scale fire-extinguishers of the type carried in public vehicles, many of which are routinely on the square.

James R. Lewis pointed out that it is highly unlikely that these victims were paid. He wrote that it was likely “a demonstration planned and executed by local practitioners—though directly inspired by a combination of Li Hongzhi’s violent apocalyptic vision, his call to non-specific action against the Chinese government, and examples of prior religious suicides and protest suicides”.

Dispute 

Following the incident, the details of why the individuals were involved has been and remains the subject of dispute between representatives of Falun Gong, the Chinese government, and other observers.

A significant challenge to arriving at a definitive assessment of the event is that independent corroboration of the government's claims has not been possible. According to Human Rights Watch (HRW), the lack of independent information made the incident one of the most difficult stories for reporters in Beijing to report. The New York Times stated that conflicting claims were difficult to assess "[w]ith propaganda streaming in from seemingly opposite ends of the universe ... especially since the remaining Falun Gong practitioners have been driven underground."

Philip Pan's investigation, and other inconsistencies highlighted by Falun Gong organisations, led some journalists and other observers to entertain the possibility that the self-immolation was not as straightforward as the Chinese official media accounts suggested. In the National Review, Ann Noonan of the Laogai Research Foundation suggested that it was "hardly a far-fetched hypothesis" that the government staged the incident or allowed it to proceed to discredit Falun Gong, as the government vowed to crush the practice before the eightieth anniversary celebrations of the Communist Party in July. Clive Ansley, a Vancouver-based rights lawyer who lived in China during the self-immolation, suggested that a dramatic response by Falun Gong would have been understandable, but ultimately concluded that the event was staged: "You've got Falun Gong people in this country, they've been oppressed over and over again, they are not allowed to speak, they are not allowed to assert any of their rights as citizens, the level of frustration must be terribly, terribly high.. I can understand people doing that.. but ironically, we ultimately found out that it was staged anyway, it was not real. It was completely staged by the government."

Reviewing the divergent narratives on the identity of the self-immolation victims, historian David Ownby concluded that "although the arguments of Falun Gong practitioners seem cogent, it is very difficult to arrive at a final judgment about the self-immolation. ... there are desperate people in China (and elsewhere) who will do anything for money (which would go to their families in this case, one supposes, unless the authorities had promised to rescue them before the flames could do harm). Or the entire event could have been staged. But it seems just as possible that those who set themselves on fire might have been new or unschooled Falun Gong practitioners, had discovered and practised Falun Gong on their own (and badly) in the post-suppression period, and, for whatever reason, decided to make the ultimate sacrifice."

Other human rights activists speculated that the five who set themselves on fire did so to protest the government's crackdown on Falun Gong. Barend ter Haar was open to the idea that the self-immolators were Falun Gong practitioners, and postulated that former Buddhists may have brought with them the "respectable Buddhist tradition of self-immolation as a sacrifice to the Buddha". He sought to account for the inconsistencies by suggesting that the government may have fabricated a video of their own when they realised the mediatic potential of the suicides.

Francesco Sisci, Asia editor of La Stampa, supported the possibility that the self-immolators were Falun Gong practitioners, writing in the Asia Times that "no one believed that the government could have paid a mother to torch herself and her daughter, or that she was so loyal to the Communist Party that she pretended to be a Falungong member and kill herself and her only daughter, even if Falungong master Li Hongzhi forbade suicide ..." In Sisci's view, Chinese officials made a mistake by arresting foreign journalists on Tiananmen —"independently filmed news footage of the proceedings could have been the best proof of Falungong madness. Instead, when the government reported the episode, it looked like propaganda."

Time noted some of the confusion surrounding the conflicting views on the self-immolation; one Beijing Falun Gong practitioner interviewed appeared to accept that the self-immolators were practitioners engaged in protest, while Falun Gong organisations overseas denied any involvement. Time also speculated that the "lack of solidarity" in Falun Gong was contributing to the sense of desperation of Mainland Chinese practitioners who may feel out of touch with the exiled leadership. Guardian reporter John Gittings reported that some observers believed it was possible that the self-immolators acted in desperation and confusion.

Some observers have speculated that if the participants were Falun Gong practitioners, they may have resorted to self-immolation in response to the publication of a new scripture by Li Hongzhi released on 1 January 2001, "Beyond the Limits of Forbearance." An article authored by a collection of Mainland Chinese Falun Gong practitioners and published on the main Chinese-language Falun Gong website noted that the scripture had caused confusion both among Falun Gong practitioners and "in society," and that some people wondered whether Falun Gong would resort to violence to resist persecution. The authors wrote that this would not occur, as violence would be both counterproductive and contrary to the core teachings of the practice. A Falun Gong spokesperson clarified that the new scripture simply meant it was time to "bring truth to light" about human rights abuses committed by the Chinese government. Nonetheless, Gittings posited that the scripture may have confused Falun Gong followers, particularly in Mainland China. Matthew Forney wrote in Time magazine that Li's message had spread into China via the internet and informal networks of followers, and speculated that it may have galvanised more radical practitioners there. David Ownby wrote that he found the brief message to be "difficult to interpret": on its surface, the scripture resembled a "call to arms" against what Li described as "evil beings who no longer have any human nature or righteous thoughts." Yet Ownby said no practitioners he talked to had seen the scripture as a "green light" for violent action. Instead, practitioners had interpreted it to mean exactly the opposite, that they could non-violently resist suppression without guilt; they could stop "simply surrendering to the police at the first moment of a confrontation. They could run away, they could organize, they were, in a word, free of whatever constraints the necessity to "forbear" had previously placed upon them." In an interview with the Washington Post, Ownby noted that Li does not endorse suicide in any of his recent statements, "But a practitioner at the end of his or her rope in China could certainly see [the statements] as an endorsement for martyrdom, and perhaps choose his or her own means to achieve that."

Aftermath

Media campaign and public opinion
The state media coverage of the event resulted in increased support for the Party's persecution efforts against Falun Gong, and eroded public sympathy for the group. Time reported that prior to the self-immolation incident, many Chinese had felt that Falun Gong posed no real threat, and that the state's persecution had gone too far. After the event, however, China's media campaign against Falun Gong gained significant traction. The World Organization to Investigate the Persecution of Falun Gong reported that hostility toward Falun Gong from the general public escalated, the government had stepped up its campaign, and charged that "hate crimes" targeting Falun Gong increased. One western diplomat commented that the public changed from sympathising with Falun Gong to siding with the Government, popular consensus seemingly shifted by human-interest stories and accounts of rehabilitation efforts of former practitioners. Østergaard believes that, in retrospect, the New Year scripture was Li's greatest gift to the state, as the self-immolations marked a turning point which ended domestic support for the movement.

The self-immolation incident was given prominent coverage in the official Chinese media, which analysts say took a propagandistic line. According to Philip Pan, the Communist Party "launched an all-out campaign to use the incident to prove its claim that Falun Gong is a dangerous cult, and to turn public opinion in China and abroad against the group ... Every morning and night, the state-controlled media carry fresh attacks against Falun Gong and its U.S.-based leader, Li Hongzhi." Posters, leaflets and videos were produced, detailing the supposed detrimental effects of Falun Gong practice. The New York Times reported that the public was "bombarded with graphic images of the act on television and in newspapers." In China's schools, regular anti-Falun Gong classes were scheduled. Eight million students joined the "Anti-Cult Action by the Youth Civilized Communities Across the Nation". Twelve million children were made to submit writings disapproving of the practice.

Within a month of the Tiananmen Square incident, authorities issued a document entitled The whole story of the self-immolation incident created by Falun Gong addicts in Tiananmen Square, containing colour photographs of charred bodies. The State Council's "Office for the Prevention and Handling of Evil Cults" declared after the event that it was now ready to form a united front with the "global anti-cult struggle". Meetings took place in factories, offices, universities and schools, and approved religious leaders across the country had delivered denunciations of Falun Gong. In Kaifeng, the post office issued an anti-Falun Gong postmark, and 10,000 people signed a petition denouncing the group.

Violence and re-education
The Washington Post reported that Chinese authorities benefited from the turn in public opinion against Falun Gong that followed the self-immolation, seizing on the opportunity to sanction "the systematic use of violence against the group." According to the Post, authorities "established a network of brainwashing classes and embarked on a painstaking effort to weed out followers neighbourhood by neighbourhood and workplace by workplace." According to sources, "reeducation" tactics employed included beatings, shocks with electric truncheons, and intensive anti-Falun Gong study classes.

According to a report published in the Wall Street Journal, in February 2001 the 6-10 Office "stepped up pressure on local governments" to implement the anti-Falun Gong campaign. In particular, it issued new, detailed instructions requiring that all who continued to actively practice Falun Gong were to be sent to prison or labour camps, and individuals who refused to renounce the practice were to be socially isolated and monitored by their families and workplaces. This was a shift from the past, when local officials sometimes tolerated Falun Gong on the condition that it was practised privately. According to Freedom House, In the year following the incident, the scale of imprisonment, torture, and deaths of Falun Gong practitioners in custody increased significantly. According to Freedom House, "months of relentless propaganda succeeded in turning public opinion against the group. Over the next year, the scale of imprisonment, torture, and even deaths of Falun Gong practitioners from abuse in custody increased dramatically."

Impact on Falun Gong's resistance
The self-immolation necessitated a change in tactics for Falun Gong. Tiananmen Square had been "permanently contaminated" as a venue for protest, according to journalist Ethan Gutmann, and Falun Gong's daily demonstrations in Beijing nearly ceased altogether. According to Human Rights Watch, practitioners may have concluded "the protests had outlived their usefulness for demonstrating Chinese abuses or for informing an overseas audience of Falungong's harmlessness." Diaspora practitioners living overseas focused their attentions on getting the word out about the treatment of practitioners by the Chinese government, issuing reports to the United Nations and human rights organisations, staging public marches and hunger strikes outside of China, and documenting human rights abuses on websites. Within China, practitioners used mass mailings and handed out literature to "spread the truth" and counter the government's allegations against them. In an August 2001 press release, the US-based Falun Dafa Information Center noted this shift in strategy, and said that Chinese practitioners "sometimes also manage to post large posters and banners in major thoroughfares. They even set up loudspeakers on rooftops or trees around labour camps and in densely populated areas to broadcast news about the human rights abuses."

In 2002, Falun Gong practitioners in Changchun successfully broadcast the two film on Chinese state television, accusing the authorities of staging the self-immolation, interrupting scheduled programming for 50 minutes. Liu Chengjun, a Falun Gong practitioner who hacked into the satellite feed, was arrested and sentenced to prison, where he died 21 months later, allegedly tortured to death. The remaining five individuals behind the television hijacking were also imprisoned, and all have reportedly died or been tortured to death in custody.

Fate of the self-immolators
Five of the people involved in the incident were sentenced in mid-2001. Although the official Xinhua news agency had described the proceedings as a "public trial," only the final day in the month-long trial was public, and consisted mainly of the reading of verdicts. The Guardian reported that on the last day of the one-month trial, Xinhua had, by mid-morning, issued a full report of the verdicts; the People's Daily had produced its own editorial by the afternoon.

Liu Yunfang, named as the mastermind, was given a life sentence; Wang Jindong was given 15 years. Two other accomplices – a 49-year-old man named Xue Hongjun, and a 34-year-old Beijing woman named Liu Xiuqin who apparently provided the group with lodging and helped in the preparation of the incident – were sentenced to 10 and 7 years in prison respectively. Liu Baorong, who had "acknowledged her crime", escaped punishment because her role in planning the event was minor. Wang Jindong went an hunger strike and his wife and daughter were taken to a reform camp.

After having denied foreign media access to the self-immolation victims for the previous year, in April 2002 the government arranged for foreign press to interview the purported survivors of the self-immolation in the presence of state officials. The interviewees refuted claims that the self-immolation was staged, showing their burn injuries as evidence, and denounced Falun Gong while expressing support for the authorities' handling of the group. When asked why they set themselves on fire, Hao Huijun replied that she had realized the futility of writing letters and demonstrating by waving banners, "so finally, we decided ... to make a big event to show our will to the world. ... We wanted to show the government that Falun Gong was good." At the time of the interview, Chen Guo and her mother were said to still be in the hospital, both having lost their hands, ears and noses. Both her mother's eyes were covered with skin grafts. Wang Jindong, showing burns to his face, said he felt "humiliated because of my stupidity and fanatical ideas."

References

External links 
 falsefire.com (Falun Gong site)
 An essay and collated sources on the incident.

2001 in China
2001 suicides
2001 fires in Asia
2000s in Beijing
Falun Gong
January 2001 events in China
Political repression in China
Propaganda in China
Suicides by self-immolation
Suicides in the People's Republic of China
Tiananmen Square